Hillard may refer to:

Surname:
Carole Hillard (1936–2007), the first woman to serve as Lieutenant Governor of South Dakota
Charlie Hillard (1938–1996), American aerobatics pilot, the first American to win the world aerobatics title
Donora Hillard (born 1982), American educator and author
Doug Hillard (1935–1997), English professional footballer
George Stillman Hillard (1808–1879), American lawyer and author
Major M. Hillard (1896–1977), Virginia politician and judge from Chesapeake, Virginia
Merris Hillard (born 1949), Australian printmaker and photographer
Norm Hillard (1915–1986), Australian rules footballer
Robert E. Hillard (1917–2000), co-established Fleishman-Hillard in St. Louis, Missouri in 1946
Steve Hillard,  private equity entrepreneur, attorney, author, and television producer

Given name:
Hillard Elkins (1929–2010), American theatre and film producer
Hillard Bell Huntington (1910–1992), physicist who first proposed, in 1935, that hydrogen could occur in a metallic state
Brewster Hillard Morris (1909–1990), American diplomat

Other:
Hillard Homes, residential high-rise development in the near South Side of Chicago, Illinois
Hillard Limestone, geologic formation in Alaska

See also
Fleishman-Hillard International Communications, public relations and marketing agency in St. Louis, Missouri
Hillards
Hillared
Hilliard (disambiguation)
Hilliardia
Hilliards (disambiguation)
Hillyard (disambiguation)